Malcolm Handscombe (born 29 June 1934) is an English footballer, who played as a centre half in the Football League for Chester.

References

Chester City F.C. players
Cambridge United F.C. players
Association football central defenders
English Football League players
Living people
1934 births
Sportspeople from Normanton, West Yorkshire
English footballers